The 1976 Grantland Rice Bowl was an NCAA Division II game following the 1976 season, between the Montana State Bobcats and the North Dakota State Bison. This was the first time that the game was hosted by one of the participants – in prior years the game had been played at a fixed location; first Murfreesboro, Tennessee and later Baton Rouge, Louisiana.

Notable participants
Montana State guard Lee Washburn was the last player selected in the 1978 NFL Draft, and tackle Jon Borchardt was selected in the 1979 NFL Draft. Quarterback Paul Dennehy and head coach Sonny Holland are inductees of the university's hall of fame.

North Dakota State defensive back Chuck Rodgers was selected in the 1977 NFL Draft. Wide receiver / kicker Mike McTague was selected in the 1979 CFL Draft. McTague and linebacker Rick Budde are inductees of the university's athletic hall of fame.

Scoring summary

References

Further reading
 

Grantland
Grantland Rice Bowl
Montana State Bobcats football bowl games
North Dakota State Bison football bowl games
December 1976 sports events in the United States
Grantland Rice